Khaja Bandanawaz University (KBNU), named after Sufi saint Bande Nawaz, is a private university located at Kalaburagi, Karnataka, India. It was officially established in 2018 by the Khaja Bandanawaz Educational Society under the Khaja Bandanawaz University Act, 2018, following the approval of the Bill in the Karnataka Legislative Assembly in February 2018. The university hosts about twenty colleges, including colleges previously under Khaja Bandanawaz Educational Society such as Khaja Banda Nawaz College of Engineering, Khaja Banda Nawaz Institute of Medical Sciences and a newly formed law college. The founding chancellor is Syed Shah Khusro Hussaini, president of the Khaja Bandanawaz Educational Society, and the vice-chancellor (VC) is to be Abdul Jaleel Khan M. Pathan (A. M. Pathan), formerly VC of Central University of Karnataka.

Academics
Khaja Bandanawaz University offers undergraduate, postgraduate and PhD programmes in the fields of engineering & technology, science, medical science, arts, commerce, management, humanities and social science. Some of the courses are BSc, BA, MA and MSc.

References

External links
 

Education in Kalaburagi
Universities in Karnataka
Educational institutions established in 2018
2018 establishments in Karnataka
Private universities in India